The Triton class is a series of 5 container ships built for Costamare and operated by Evergreen Marine. The ships have a maximum theoretical capacity of 14,424 TEU. The ships were built by Samsung Heavy Industries in South Korea.

List of ships

See also 
 Evergreen G-class container ship
 Thalassa Hellas-class container ship

References 

Container ship classes
Ships built by Samsung Heavy Industries